Janet Marder was the first female president of the Reform Movement's Central Conference of American Rabbis (CCAR), which means she was the first woman to lead a major rabbinical organization and the first woman to lead any major Jewish co-ed religious organization in the United States; she became president of the CCAR in 2003. She was also the first woman and the first non-congregational rabbi to be elected as the President of the Pacific Association of Reform Rabbis.

She was born in Los Angeles, and was ordained in New York in 1979 at the Hebrew Union College-Jewish Institute of Religion, a Reform seminary. She became the first ordained rabbi of Beth Chayim Chadashim (the world's first gay and lesbian synagogue recognized by Reform Judaism) in 1983. While there she founded NECHAMA, an AIDS-education program for the Jewish community. In 1988, she became the assistant director of the Union of American Hebrew Congregations Pacific Southwest Council, where she worked for eleven years, eventually becoming director. In 1999, she became the Senior Rabbi of Congregation Beth Am in Los Altos Hills, California.

See also
Timeline of women rabbis

References 

Reform women rabbis
American Reform rabbis
Living people
People from Los Angeles
People from Los Altos Hills, California
Year of birth missing (living people)
21st-century American Jews